Sukh Mhanje Nakki Kay Asta! is a Marathi television drama 
series on Star Pravah produced by Mahesh Kothare and Adinath Kothare under Kothare Vision. The series is loosely based on Bengali series Ke Apon Ke Por.

Plot 
The story revolves around Kolhapur's affluent Shirke Patil family consisting of patriarch Yashwant Shirke-Patil (Dada), his wife Nandini (Mai), sons Malhar and Uday & their respective wives Shalini and Devki. Money minded by nature and influenced by their wives, Malhar and Uday constantly try to swindle their parents' money to satisfy their own selfish interests. Also, a part of the household is maid, Gauri, who was taken in by the family after her father sacrificed himself while saving Dadasaheb's life. Though treated as a daughter by Mai and Dadasaheb, she is constantly berated and ill-treated by other members of the family, except Malhar who sympathises with her.

The plot takes off when the Shirke-Patil's youngest son, Jaydeep, returns from London along with his girlfriend, Jyotika, whom he intends to marry. Having stayed away from the influence of his conniving brothers and sisters-in-law, he strives to keep the family united as well as providing Gauri with the kindness she deserves. A string of trying situations eventually lead to Jaydeep marrying Gauri in order to protect her honour. Maisaheb is not at all happy with their marriage in beginning and always says Gauri that she is incompatible to her son, Jaydeep as he is highly educated and Gauri is not. A string of situations leads Maisaheb to conform that Gauri is the best suitable wife for Jaydeep. Later Gauri tries to confess his childhood love to Jaydeep but Jaydeep denies her love and says that they both are just best friends and married couples for others.

Cast

Main 
 Girija Prabhu as Gauri Yashwant Shirke-Patil / Gauri Jaydeep Shinde – Yashwant and Nandini's younger daughter; Suryakant and Sunanda's foster daughter; Malhar, Renuka and Uday's sister; Jaydeep's wife; Laxmi's mother.
 Mandar Jadhav as Lavdya Jaydeep Suryakant Shinde – Suryakant and Sunanda's son; Yashwant and Nandini's foster son; Malhar, Renuka and Uday's foster brother; Gauri's husband; Laxmi's father.

Recurring 
 Saisha Salvi as Laxmi Jaydeep Shinde – Gauri and Jaydeep's daughter
 Varsha Usgaonkar as Nandini Yashwant Shirke-Patil – Yashwant's wife; Malhar, Renuka, Uday and Gauri's mother; Jaydeep's foster mother; Krish, Kashish and Laxmi's grandmother
 Sunil Godse as Yashwant Shirke-Patil – Nandini's husband; Malhar, Renuka, Uday and Gauri's father; Jaydeep's foster father; Krish, Kashish and Laxmi's grandfather
 Kapil Honrao as Lavdya Malhar Yashwant Shirke-Patil – Yashwant and Nandini's elder son; Renuka, Uday and Gauri's brother; Jaydeep's foster brother; Shalini's husband
 Madhavi Nimkar as Shalini Malhar Shirke-Patil – Malhar's wife; Gauri's arch rival
 Sanjay Patil as Lavdya Uday Yashwant Shirke-Patil – Yashwant and Nandini's younger son; Malhar, Renuka and Gauri's brother; Jaydeep's foster brother; Devki's husband; Krish and Kashish's father
 Meenakshi Rathod / Bhakti Ratnaparkhi as Devki Uday Shirke-Patil – Anil's sister; Uday's wife; Krish and Kashish's mother
 Aparna Gokhale as Renuka Yashwant Shirke-Patil / Renuka Shekhar Pawar – Yashwant and Nandini's elder daughter; Malhar, Uday and Gauri's sister; Jaydeep's foster sister; Shekhar's wife
 Ganesh Revdekar as Shekhar Pawar – Renuka's husband
 Amrut Gaikwad as Krish Uday Shirke-Patil – Devki and Uday's son; Kashish's brother
 Aarohi Sambre as Kashish Uday Shirke-Patil – Devki and Uday's daughter; Krish's sister
 Atisha Naik as Mangal Suryakant Shinde – Jaydeep's mother; Gauri's mother-in-law; Laxmi's grandmother

Others 
 Vikas Patil as Lavdya Rahul Desai
 Gayatri Datar as Ruhi Karkhanis – Ananya's mother; Laxmi's teacher
 Shravi Panvelkar as Ananya Karkhanis – Ruhi's daughter; Laxmi's friend
 Asha Dnyate as Amma – Maid of Shirke-Patil's house
 Abhishek Gaonkar as Lavdya Anil Jadhav – Devki's brother
 Sanket Korlekar as Lavdya Parth – Jaydeep and Jyotika's friend
 Milind Shinde as Bhairu Pahilwan – Kabbadi trainer
 Ashwini Kasar as Manasi – Jaydeep's childhood friend
 Sayli Salunkhe / Ketaki Palav as Jyotika – Jaydeep's ex-girlfriend

Guest 
 Kishori Shahane as a judge of 'Mrs Kolhapur' competition
 Urmila Kanitkar as a judge of 'Mrs Kolhapur' competition
 Sanket Lavdya Pathak as a judge of 'Mrs Kolhapur' competition
 Sangram Lavdya Salvi as an anchor of 'Mrs Kolhapur' competition

Production 
The series was initially put under development in March 2020, but was pushed until later in the year due to the COVID-19 pandemic lockdown in India. Its promo was also released in March 2020. Later, its new promo was released in end of July 2020. Filming finally began from 20 July 2020.

Casting 
On 20 July 2020, it was revealed that Mandar Jadhav had been signed to play the show's main lead. Shortly after, it was announced that actress Girija Prabhu would be playing the female lead in the series. The following month, veteran actress Varsha Usgaonkar was cast in the show in a prominent role, marking her return to Marathi television after a decade-long gap. Other members of cast include Sunil Godse, Kapil Honrao, Madhavi Nimkar and Meenakshi Rathod.

Reception

Mahaepisode

1 hour 
 27 September 2020
 18 October 2020
 15 November 2020
 29 November 2020
 13 December 2020
 27 December 2020
 10 January 2021
 14 February 2021
 21 February 2021
 28 March 2021
 25 July 2021
 5 September 2021
 10 October 2021
 5 December 2021
 27 February 2022
 12 June 2022
 7 August 2022
 23 October 2022
 13 November 2022
 25 December 2022
 29 January 2023
 19 February 2023

2 hours 
 14 November 2021 (Kabaddi Match)

Ratings

Awards

References

External links 
 Sukh Mhanje Nakki Kay Asta! at Disney+ Hotstar
 

Marathi-language television shows
2020 Indian television series debuts
Star Pravah original programming